Kallavesi is a medium-sized lake in Northern Savonia, eastern Finland located around the town of Kuopio. Combined with the lakes Suvasvesi, Juurusvesi–Akonvesi, Muuruvesi, Melavesi, and Riistavesi Kallavesi forms an  lake system named Iso-Kalla. Kallavesi is the largest lake in the region and the tenth largest lake in the country.

See also
 Finnish Lakeland
 Port of Kuopio

References

External links

LKallavesi
Lakes of Kuopio
Lakes of Siilinjärvi
Lakes of Leppävirta